E. spinosa may refer to:
 Echinophora spinosa, a grass species in the genus Echinophora
 Elaeagnus spinosa, a psychedelic plant species in the genus Elaeagnus
 Elliptio spinosa, a spiny mussel species
 Emex spinosa, a herbaceous plant species
 Empusa spinosa, a mantis species
 Eoleptestheria spinosa, a crustacean species
 Euphorbia spinosa, a spurge species in the genus Euphorbia

See also
 Spinosa (disambiguation)